Michael Moore (September 7, 1956 – July 6, 2016) was a collegiate football standout and native of Chattanooga, Tennessee.

He began his football legacy at Brainerd High School where he held numerous rushing records.  He played his collegiate football with the Middle Tennessee State Blue Raiders where he again emerged as a standout running back earning both All Ohio Valley Conference and All-American honors in 1976.

Mike Moore was drafted in the 12th round of the 1978 NFL Draft by the Miami Dolphins.

He played in pre-season NFL football games with the Houston Oilers alongside of Earl Campbell who was also drafted in the 1978 draft.

Moore is enshrined in the Chattanooga Sports Hall of Fame.

Moore was inducted into the MTSU Blue Raider Hall of Fame Class of 2007 and was a member of the Kappa Alpha Psi fraternity.

References

External links
  National Football League
 Pro Football Reference - Miami Dolphins
 MTSU Blue Raider Hall of Fame  Class of 2007 Inductee
 Go Blue Raiders
  Chattanooga Sports Hall of Fame, The Chattanoogan
  Ohio Valley Conference

1956 births
2016 deaths
Sportspeople from Chattanooga, Tennessee
Players of American football from Tennessee
American football running backs
Middle Tennessee Blue Raiders football players